Mount Johnson, Johnson Mountain, Johnson Peak, or variation, may refer to:

Places
 Mount Johnson, Lower Canada, Province of Canada; former name of Mont-Saint-Grégoire, Quebec, Canada
 Johnson Mountain, Montana, USA

Mountains
 Johnson Peak, Tuolumne Meadows, Yosemite National Park, California, USA
 Johnson Peak (Antarctica), Hart Hills, Ellsworth Land, Antarctica
 Johnson Peaks, Mittlere Petermann Range, Wohlthat Mountains, Queen Maud Land, Antarctica
 Johnson Mountain (Utah), Zion National Park, Utah
 Johnson Mountain (Washington), Cascade Range, Washington State, USA
 Mount Johnson (California), Sierra Nevada range, USA
 Mount Johnson (Washington), Olympics Mountains, Washington State, USA
 Mount Johnson (Alaska), Denali National Park, Alaska, USA; located near Mount Church (Alaska)

Other uses
 Mount Johnson, a colonial farmstead on the Mohawk River, in the Province of New York, owned by Sir William Johnson, 1st Baronet
 Mount Johnson, a Loyalist farmstead near Chambly, Quebec, owned by Sir John Johnson, 2nd Baronet

See also
 Johnson (disambiguation)
 La Mont Johnson (disambiguation)
 Mont and Harriet Johnson House, Springville, Utah, USA; formerly owned by Mont Johnson
 Johnson Mountain Boys, U.S. band